Acta or ACTA may refer to:

Institutions
 Anti-Counterfeiting Trade Agreement, an intellectual property trade agreement
 Administrative Council for Terminal Attachments, a standards organization for terminal equipment such as registered jacks
 Alameda Corridor Transportation Authority, in southern California
 American Council of Trustees and Alumni, an education organization
 Atlantic County Transportation Authority, a transportation agency in Atlantic County, New Jersey
 Australian Community Television Alliance, an industry association representing community television licensees in Australia

Science and technology
 Acta, the transactions (proceedings) of an academic field, a learned society, or an academic conference
 Acta (software), early outliner software
 Activin A, mammalian protein
 ACTA1, actin alpha 1 (skeletal muscle), human protein
 ACTA2, actin alpha 2 (smooth muscle), human protein
 Actin assembly-inducing protein, motility protein in the bacterium Listeria monocytogenes

People 
 Manny Acta (born 1969), American baseball coach

Other uses 
 Acts of the Apostles (genre) (Latin: Acta), Early Christian literature recounting the lives and works of the apostles of Jesus

See also